Manashi Goto (Gotō Manashi, born 1949) is a Japanese nuclear engineer, author, activist and commentator on the Fukushima Daiichi nuclear disaster.

He is the designer of the containment buildings of various nuclear reactors owned by Toshiba, where he worked from 1989 to 2009; including the  containment buildings of Kashiwazaki-Kariwa Nuclear Power Plant (Units 3 and 6), Hamaoka Nuclear Power Plant (Units 3 and 4) and Onagawa Nuclear Power Plant (Unit 3). His predecessors in Toshiba manufactured four of the six reactors of the Fukushima Daiichi nuclear power plant in the 1970s. He rose to public prominence on 14 March 2011 by being the first "insider" (Note: he is in retirement after 2009) addressing the press at the Foreign Correspondents' Club of Japan, three days after the Fukushima Daiichi nuclear disaster. Since then, he became a regular commentator and featured as an expert in hearings regarding the nuclear disaster at Japan's Nuclear and Industrial Safety Agency and House of Councillors. From April 2013, he joined as an expert in the Citizen's Commission on Nuclear Energy, a prominent think tank composed of professors of public policy.

Academic career
He obtained a Doctor of Engineering in Tokyo Institute of Technology in 2005. After retirement from Toshiba in 2009, he was a lecturer on nuclear engineering in Waseda University, Tokyo City University, Shibaura Institute of Technology and Kokugakuin University.

References

Japanese nuclear engineers
Tokyo Institute of Technology alumni
1949 births
Living people